Compacta, a Latin adjective for compact, may refer to:

 Compacta (genus), a genus of moths
 Compacta (typeface), a typeface
and also
 In mathematics, the plural of compactum, meaning a compact set
 Pars compacta, a portion of the substantia nigra in anatomy

See also
 Compactum